Marcia D. Greenberger is an American women's rights attorney.

She received her B.A. with honors and J.D. cum laude from the University of Pennsylvania, and then worked as a lawyer with the Washington, D.C., firm of Caplin and Drysdale. She co-founded the National Women's Law Center in 1981 with Nancy Duff Campbell, where they served as co-presidents until 2017 when both retired. The National Women's Law Center was founded by them to fight for gender equality in economic security, education, health, and jobs. It began when  female administrative staff and law students at the Center for Law and Social Policy demanded that their pay be improved, that the center hire female lawyers, that they no longer be expected to serve coffee, and that the center create a women's program. Greenberger was hired in 1972 to start the program and Campbell joined her in 1978. In 1981, the two decided to turn the program into the separate National Women's Law Center.

In 2015 Greenberger was inducted into the National Women's Hall of Fame.

She is married to Michael Greenberger.

References

External links

American women lawyers
Living people
Year of birth missing (living people)
21st-century American women